Trương Thị Mai (born 23 January 1958) is a Vietnamese politician. She currently serves as the Permanent Member of the Secretariat and Head of the Central Organization Commission of the Communist Party of Vietnam, being the first woman to hold these positions.  

Mai is a member of both the Secretariat and Politburo, the country's highest decision-making bodies, in which she ranked 5th after the General Secretary, the President, the Prime Minister and the National Assembly Chair. 

A member of the Party Central Committee since 2006, she was previously the Head of the Party's Mass Mobilisation Commission. A long-time member of the National Assembly of Vietnam since 1997, Mai also served as Chair of the Parliamentary Committee for Social Affairs and Deputy Chair of the Parliamentary Committee for Culture, Education, Youth, Adolescents and Children. She was the President of the Vietnam–Cuba Friendship Association.

Before entering national politics, Mai was the President of the Vietnam Youth Federation, being the first woman to do so. She was also a standing member of the Central Committee's Secretariat of the Hồ Chí Minh Communist Youth Union.

She held a Bachelor of History, a Bachelor of Law and a Master of Public Administration as well as an Advanced Degree in Political Theory from the party school.

Background and education 

Trương Thị Mai was born on January 23, 1958, in Quảng Bình Province, Vietnam. Her family moved to Da Lat, Lâm Đồng when she was young. She grew up here and majored in History at Dalat University, receiving a Bachelor of History.

She attended the National Academy of Public Administration in Hanoi, received a Bachelor of Laws, then continued to major in Public Administration and obtained a Master's degree in Public Administration. On October 11, 1985, she was admitted to the Communist Party of Vietnam, becoming an official member on October 11, 1986. She also attended courses at Hồ Chí Minh National Academy of Politics, receiving an advanced degree in political theory.

Career

Communist Youth Union 

Trương Thị Mai has spent many years working in Hồ Chí Minh Communist Youth Union. From October 15 to 18, 1992, National Congress of the Hồ Chí Minh Communist Youth Union took place in Hanoi, electing her a member of the Hồ Chí Minh Communist Youth Union Central Committee's Secretariat. In 1997, she continued to be elected to Central Committee's Secretariat. In the same year, she was appointed Vice President and General Secretary of the Central Committee of the Vietnam Youth Federation, while still working in the Youth Union at the same time. In March 1998, she was officially elected President of Vietnam Youth Federation, becoming the first female president of this organization. At the Congress of Vietnam Youth Federation in January 2000, she continued to be elected President before being relieved of her duties at the meeting of the Central Committee of Vietnam Youth Federation on February 15, 2003.

In July 2001, she was elected to become a Standing member of the Hồ Chí Minh Communist Youth Union Central Committee's Secretariat. She worked for the Youth Union Central Committee for 10 years, from 1992 to December 2002.

National Assembly

Trương Thị Mai has been a member of the National Assembly of Vietnam since 1997. In 1997, she was elected a Member of the National Assembly, Cà Mau Province Delegation, and also a member of National Assembly Law Committee. From 2002 - 2007, she was a member of the Trà Vinh Delegation to the National Assembly.

From 2007 – 2011, she was a member of Bình Phước Delegation to the National Assembly. On May 20, 2007, after the first session of the 12th National Assembly, she was elected a member of Standing Committee of the National Assembly and the Chairwoman of the National Assembly Social Affairs Committee. On January 18, 2011, at the 11th Congress of the Communist Party of Vietnam, she was elected a member of the Central Committee of the Communist Party of Vietnam. She also continued to be a member of Standing Committee of the National Assembly and the Chairwoman of the National Assembly Social Affairs Committee.

From 2011 to 2021, she was a Member of the National Assembly, Lâm Đồng Delegation. She was elected a member of the National Assembly on May 22, 2016, in constituency 02, including the 3 districts: Lâm Hà District, Đam Rông District and Di Linh District. She got 194,275 votes, 79.93% of total valid votes.

In November 2014, she got the third highest number of votes, in a vote of confidence, after the Chairwoman of the National Assembly Nguyen Thi Kim Ngan and the President Truong Tan Sang.

Party Central Committee 

On January 26, 2016, at the 12th National Congress of the Communist Party of Vietnam, she was elected a member of the Central Committee of the Communist Party of Vietnam. The next day, on January 27, 2016, she was elected to the Politburo of the Central Committee of the Communist Party of Vietnam. On February 4, 2016, she became a member of the Secretariat of the Central Committee of the Communist Party of Vietnam, and the Head of the Mass Mobilisation Commission of the CPV Central Committee.

In April 2016, she was appointed by the Politburo to be a member of the Presidium of the Central Committee of the Vietnam Fatherland Front. On May 24, 2017, she became the President of the Vietnam - Cuba Friendship Association, succeeding Nguyen Thi Kim Ngan.

Politburo

Organization Commission 
On January 30, 2021, at the 13th National Congress of the Communist Party of Vietnam, she was elected as a full member of the 13th Central Committee of the Communist Party of Vietnam. The next day, on January 31, at the first plenum of the 13th Party Central Committee, she was elected a member of the Politburo of the Communist Party of Vietnam. On April 8, 2021, she was appointed Head of Organization Commission of the Central Committee of the Communist Party of Vietnam, succeeding Phạm Minh Chính, the first-ever woman one.

Secretariat 
On 6 March 2023, the 13th Politburo appointed Mai to the post Permanent Member of the Secretariat, succeeding Võ Văn Thưởng, who left office after his election as President of Vietnam on 2 March 2023. Mai is the first woman to hold this position.

Notes

References

Members of the 12th Politburo of the Communist Party of Vietnam
Members of the 13th Politburo of the Communist Party of Vietnam
Members of the 12th Secretariat of the Communist Party of Vietnam
Members of the 13th Secretariat of the Communist Party of Vietnam
Members of the 10th Central Committee of the Communist Party of Vietnam
Members of the 11th Central Committee of the Communist Party of Vietnam
Members of the 12th Central Committee of the Communist Party of Vietnam
Members of the 13th Central Committee of the Communist Party of Vietnam
Living people
1958 births
21st-century Vietnamese women politicians
21st-century Vietnamese politicians
People from Quảng Bình province